Helen Turner may refer to:
 Helen Turner (basketball), British wheelchair basketball player
 Helen Turner (artist), American painter and teacher
 Helen Alma Newton Turner, Australian geneticist and statistician
 Helen Monro Turner, Scottish artist
 Helene Turner, sometimes credited as Helen Turner, American film editor
 Helen Turner Watson, American nurse and educator